Lithuania competed at the 2012 Summer Paralympics in London, United Kingdom, from 29 August to 9 September 2012.

Athletics 

Men's field events

Women's field events

Goalball 

Lithuania qualified a men's team of 6 players.

Men's tournament

Roster

Saulius Leonavičius
Genrikas Pavliukianecas
Marius Zibolis

Arvydas Juchna
Nerijus Montvydas
Mantas Panovas

Group A

Quarter-final

Semi-final

Bronze Medal Match

Swimming 

Men

See also
Lithuania at the Paralympics
Lithuania at the 2012 Summer Olympics

References

Nations at the 2012 Summer Paralympics
2012
Paralympics